Murray M. Silver Jr. is an American rock music writer and photographer. Silver was born in Savannah, Georgia, in 1953. At age 16, he and his father, a lawyer, promoted rock concerts in Atlanta, bringing many future groups to the city for the first time, including Fleetwood Mac, the Grateful Dead, the Allman Brothers, Sonny & Cher, and Paul Simon.

Silver parlayed his contacts in the music world into a career as a rock tour photographer and journalist, covering the greatest acts of the 1970s and 1980s, including Pink Floyd, Genesis, Paul McCartney, George Harrison, Bob Dylan, Elton John, and Peter Gabriel. Silver was the very first to photograph and interview the Sex Pistols during their only tour of America, in 1977.

In 1982 Silver published his first book, Great Balls of Fire: The Uncensored Story of Jerry Lee Lewis, which was written with Lewis' ex-wife Myra Gale Brown. The book was adapted into the big screen by Orion Pictures in 1989. Silver is also credited with discovering singer-songwriter and recording artist Ed Hale, then known as Eddie Darling, during this same time period. Hale was still in high school but had allegedly dropped out to attend the Art Institute of Atlanta to study audio engineering. Silver was a teacher at the school who taught a class called The History of Popular Music.

Following the release of the film, Silver undertook the autobiography of Dr. George Nichopoulos, personal physician to Elvis Presley, and the man widely regarded to be responsible for the singer's death. Their book, Who Killed Elvis Presley? turned into an international scandal before it could be published.

While making the movie of his book, Silver was introduced to the XIVth Dalai Lama by mutual friend, Richard Gere. At the Dalai Lama's request, Silver set aside the business of his life, both personal and professional, to write articles about China's oppression of Tibet, and to sponsor tours of Tibetan Buddhist monks who perform their sacred chants and dances at colleges and museums throughout the United States. In 1998 Silver was tour manager for Sacred Music, Sacred Dance, and personally responsible for packing and transporting The Mystical Arts of Tibet Exhibit, which featured personal sacred objects of the Dalai Lama.

Silver has also published a book entitled Behind The Moss Curtain: And Other Great Savannah Stories. The book is mainly about ghost stories which Silver has either personally encountered or has been told about. For the last couple of years, Silver has traveled America taking pictures of "orbs" which are supposedly ghosts. (Orbs show up on digital camera photos. They are white circles that can be both in groups and single.)

Silver unsuccessfully ran for mayor of Savannah in 2015.

Published works
 Great Balls of Fire: The Uncensored Story of Jerry Lee Lewis
 Behind the Moss Curtain and Other Great Savannah Stories
 When Elvis Meets the Dalai Lama  )
 Tech's Luck: The Story of Jim Luck

References

External links

Writers from Savannah, Georgia
American writers about music
1953 births
Living people